Billy Clements (birth unknown – death unknown) was an English professional rugby league footballer who played in the 1920s, and coached in the 1930s.

Background
Billy Clements was born in Featherstone, Wakefield, West Riding of Yorkshire, England.

Playing career
Billy Clements made his début for Featherstone Rovers as a Utility Forward on Saturday 27 August 1921, he made his début for Wakefield Trinity as a  during January 1928, he appears to have scored no drop-goals (or field-goals as they are currently known in Australasia), but prior to the 1974–75 season all goals, whether; conversions, penalties, or drop-goals, scored 2-points, consequently prior to this date drop-goals were often not explicitly documented, therefore '0' drop-goals may indicate drop-goals not recorded, rather than no drop-goals scored. In addition, prior to the 1949–50 season, the archaic field-goal was also still a valid means of scoring points.

County honours
Billy Clements won caps for Yorkshire while at Featherstone Rovers; during the 1922–23 season against Lancashire, during the 1923–24 season against Cumberland, and during the 1925–26 season against Lancashire.

References

External links
Search for "Clements" at rugbyleagueproject.org
John Willie Higson
(archived by web.archive.org) Coaching statistics at thecastlefordtigers.co.uk
Billy Clements Memory Box Search at archive.castigersheritage.com

Castleford Tigers coaches
English rugby league coaches
English rugby league players
Featherstone Rovers players
Place of death missing
Rugby league players from Featherstone
Rugby league props
Wakefield Trinity players
Year of birth missing
Year of death missing
Yorkshire rugby league team players